Kulushevo (Qoloş) is a rural locality (a village) in Savaleyevsky Selsoviet, Karmaskalinsky District, Bashkortostan, Russia. The population was 255 as of 2010. There are 11 streets.

Geography 
Kulushevo is located 27 km north of Karmaskaly (the district's administrative centre) by road. Kabakovo is the nearest rural locality.

References 

Rural localities in Karmaskalinsky District